Stigmella lapponica is a moth of the family Nepticulidae found in Asia, Europe and North America. It was first described by the German entomologist, Maximilian Ferdinand Wocke in 1862. The larvae mine (feed inside) the leaves of birch (Betula species).

Life history
The wingspan is 5–7 mm. The head is ferruginous-orange to blackish. Antennal eyecaps whitish. Forewings light fuscous  with a somewhat oblique shining whitish-ochreous fascia at 2/3; apical area beyond this darker purple-fuscous; cilia round apex ochreous whitish except at base. Hindwings light grey. Adults are on wing in May. There is one generation per year.

Ovum
Eggs are laid on the underside of a birch leaf, usually beside a rib. Species recorded include shrubby birch (Betula humilis), dwarf birch (Betula nana), silver birch (Betula pendula) and downy birch (Betula pubescens), including Betula pubescens carpatica.

Larvae
Larvae are greenish white with a darker green gut; the head has some brown which is darker than the similar looking Stigmella confusella. They mine the leaves of their host plant in a slender corridor that hardly widens. The first quarter of the mine is filled with cloudy green frass and the mine than becomes wider with black frass, leaving broad clear margins. The gallery is long and tends to be angular as it follows veins and makes sudden changes in direction; it can cross veins and the midrib. They feed in June and July and have been found in October, suggesting a partial second brood.

Cocoon
The cocoon is spun below the surface and is deep reddish or purplish brown.

Distribution
It is found in most of Europe (except the Balkan Peninsula and the Mediterranean islands), east to the eastern part of the Palearctic realm. The moth has been found in British Columbia Canada.

Etymology
Stigmella lapponica was described by Maximilian Ferdinand Wocke in 1862 from a specimen found at Bossekop, Finnmark, Norway. The specific name refers to lapponicus, Lappish; the location of the type specimen in northern Norway. Stigmella – ″stigma″, a small dot or a brand, referring to the conspicuous (or occasionally metallic) fascia on the forewing of many of the Stigmella species, or possibly the small size of the moths.

References

External links
 Swedish moths
 Stigmella lapponica images at Consortium for the Barcode of Life
 lepiforum.de

Nepticulidae
Leaf miners
Moths described in 1862
Moths of Asia
Moths of Europe
Taxa named by Maximilian Ferdinand Wocke